The XG antigen is a red blood cell surface antigen discovered in 1962. by researchers at the MRC Blood Group Unit.

The PBDX gene that encodes the antigen is located on the short arm of the X chromosome. Since males normally have one X chromosome they are considered hemizygotes. Since women have two copies of the gene and could be heterozygotic for the presence or absence of the functioning gene they could (through the process of lyonisation) express the functioning protein on just some of their red blood cells.

Frequency

References

Blood antigen systems

Transfusion medicine